The Asian Journal of Pentecostal Studies is an English-language peer-reviewed academic journal sponsored by the Asia Pacific Theological Seminary (APTS). It is one of the longest running journals of its kind in the Majority World. It is published in Baguio, the Philippines.

Objectives
The journal has a stated objective "to encourage serious theological thinking and articulation by Pentecostals/Charismatics in Asia; to promote interaction among Asian Pentecostals/Charismatics and dialogue with other Christian traditions; to stimulate creative contextualization of the Christian faith; and to provide a means for Pentecostals/Charismatics to share their theological reflection."

Editorial
The first issue was released January, 1998 and is published semi-annually. Its founding editors were Wonsuk Ma, (then) Academic Dean of the APTS and William W. Menzies, Chancellor of APTS. The current managing editor, Dr. Dave Johnson, assumed the position in June, 2012.

Contributors
Contributions are largely, but not exclusively, from Pentecostal and Charismatic scholars and non-participating scholars on Asian topics.

References

Mass media in the Philippines
Pentecostalism in Asia
Publications established in 1998
Baguio
Protestant studies journals
Biannual journals